Fauvergue is a surname.

List of people with the surname 

 Jean-Michel Fauvergue (born 1957), French politician
 Nicolas Fauvergue (born 1984), French professional footballer

See also 

 Fovargue

Surnames
Surnames of French origin
French-language surnames